Deuterolysin (Penicillium roqueforti protease II, microbial neutral proteinase II, acid metalloproteinase, neutral proteinase II, Penicillium roqueforti metalloproteinase) is an enzyme. This enzyme catalyses the following chemical reaction

 Preferential cleavage of bonds with hydrophobic residues in P1'; also Asn3-Gln and Gly8-Ser bonds in insulin B chain

This enzyme is present in Penicillium roqueforti, P. caseicolum, Pyricularia oryzae, Aspergillus sojae and A. oryzae.

References

External links 
 

EC 3.4.24